(commonly anglicised as Tomás O'Crohan and occasionally as Thomas O'Crohan; 1855 – 7 March 1937) was a native of the Irish-speaking Great Blasket Island near the coast of the Dingle Peninsula in Ireland. Both have been translated into English. He is known as the "godfather" of Blasket Island writers. The 2012 translation by Garry Bannister and David Sowby is to date the only unabridged version available in English. In addition to his writings, Ó Criomhthain also provided content for Father George Clune's lexicon of the Munster Irish dialect, Réilthíní Óir.

Biography

It is unclear precisely when Ó Criomhthain was born. In the first sentence of An tOileánach, he states that he was born on St. Thomas's Day in 1856. However, records indicate that he was baptised on 29 April 1855.

Ó Criomhthain was the youngest of 10 siblings, only five of whom survived to adulthood: four sisters, Maura, Kate, Eileen, and Nora, and a brother, Pats. Ó Criomhthain received an intermittent education between the ages of 10 and 18 whenever a schoolteacher from the mainland spent time living on the island.
He married Máire Ní Chatháin on 5 February 1878. Together they had ten children, but many died before reaching adulthood: one boy fell from a cliff while hunting for a fledgling gull to keep as a pet among the chickens; others died of measles and whooping cough; their son Domhnall drowned while attempting to save a woman from the sea; others died by various other means. Máire herself died while still relatively young. Their son Seán also wrote a book, Lá dar Saol ("A Day in Our Life"), describing the emigration of the remaining islanders to the mainland and America when the Great Blasket was finally abandoned in the 1940s and 1950s.

He died on 7 March 1937 at the age of 81.

Writings 

His books — An tOileánach in particular — are considered classics of Irish-language literature, and central texts of the corpus of the Gaelic Revival.  Containing portrayals of a unique way of life, now extinct, they are of great human, literary, linguistic, and anthropological interest. 

He began to write down his experiences in diary-letters in the years after World War I, following persistent encouragement by Brian Ó Ceallaigh from Killarney. Ó Ceallaigh overcame Ó Criomhthain's initial reluctance by showing him works by Maxim Gorky and Pierre Loti, books describing the lives of peasants and fishermen, to prove to Ó Criomhthain the interest and value of such a project. Once persuaded, Ó Criomhthain sent Ó Ceallaigh a series of daily letters for five years – a diary – which the latter forwarded to scholar and writer Pádraig "An Seabhac" Ó Siochfhradha for editing for publication. Ó Ceallaigh then convinced Ó Criomhthain to write his life story and best-known work, An t-Oileánach. A result of Ó Criomthain's letter-writing style, the book is noted for its brevity and lack of portrayal of the author's emotions. Traditionally viewed as more a cultural ethnography than a work of literary merit, this stance has been challenged in recent times by scholars such as Mark Quigley.

Works 
Allagar na hInise,  
Allagar 11, Coiscéim 1999 Edited by Pádraig Ua Maoileoin
An tOileánach, Cló Talbóid 2002,  
 

Translations
 Island Cross-Talk: Pages from a Diary, translated by Tim Enright; Oxford University Press, 1987;  
 The Islandman, translated by Robin Flower; Oxford, Clarendon Press, 1951; 
 The Islander, translated by Garry Bannister and David Sowby; Gill & MacMillan, 2013;

See also

An Béal Bocht  
Blasket Islands
List of people on stamps of Ireland
Peig Sayers

References

Citations

Sources

External links 

 Ó Criomhthain's Ricorso database entry
 The Blascaod Centre in Dún Chaoin

1856 births
1937 deaths
20th-century Irish people
21st-century Irish people
Blasket Islands
Fishers
Gaelic culture
Irish diarists
Irish memoirists
Irish-language writers
People from Dingle
Irish storytellers